Aggrey Chiyangi (born 5 June 1964) is a Zambian former football player and current manager of Green Eagles.

Club career
Born in Kitwe, Chiyangi attended Kitwe Boys Secondary School, playing for the school team. Upon leaving school, Chiyangi signed for Power Dynamos, playing for the club between 1984 and 1997.

International career
Chiyangi made his debut for Zambia  on 23 May 1993, in a 1–0 loss against Malawi. On 11 July 1993, Chiyangi scored his first, and only, goal for Zambia in a 3–0 win against South Africa. In total, Chiyangi made 28 appearances for Zambia, scoring once.

International goals
Scores and results list Zambia's goal tally first.

Managerial career
Following his playing career, Chiyangi moved into management, managing Green Buffaloes, Power Dynamos, Chambishi as well as Botswana Premier League club Lobtrans Gunners. In March 2014, Chiyangi was appointed manager of Zanaco. In 2015, Chiyangi joined Nkana as manager, before his sacking in January 2017. In June 2017, Chiyangi was named manager of Green Eagles. Between 2019 and 2020, Chiyangi was caretaker manager of the Zambian national team.

References

1964 births
People from Kitwe
Living people
Association football defenders
Zambian footballers
Zambia international footballers
Zambian football managers
Power Dynamos F.C. players
1994 African Cup of Nations players
1996 African Cup of Nations players
Zambia Super League players
Zambian expatriate sportspeople in Botswana
Zambian expatriate football managers
Expatriate football managers in Botswana
Zambia national football team managers